The discography of Love and Rockets, an English alternative rock band, consists of seven studio albums, one compilation album, one live album, two video albums, and 21 singles.

Albums

Studio albums

Compilation albums 

 Sorted! The Best of Love and Rockets (2003)

Live albums 

 So Alive (2003)

Videos 

 The Haunted Fishtank (1989)
 Sorted! The Best of Love and Rockets (2003)

Singles

Notes

References

External links 

 
 

Discographies of British artists
Alternative rock discographies